Batrachedra myrmecophila is a moth in the family Batrachedridae. It is found on Java.

References

Natural History Museum Lepidoptera generic names catalog

Batrachedridae
Moths described in 1908